Peter-Ernst Eiffe (1941 - c. December 1982), also known as "Eiffe, der Bär" (German for 'Eiffe, the bear') was probably the first Graffiti artist in Germany. During the German student movement of May 1968, he distributed his messages all over Hamburg and became also known for entering the central station of Hamburg with a Fiat 600. On this occasion he was arrested and after a depression in 1970 retained in a psychiatric institution. Trying to escape from there in December 1982, he froze to death. His life was documented in a 1995 film with the title Eiffe for President - Alle Ampeln auf Gelb (Eiffe for president, all traffic lights to yellow), named after one of his famous graffitis.

Early life 

Eiffe grew up in Hamburg Duvenstedt with adoptive parents. His adoptive father was senator for Berlinangelegenheiten (Berlin affairs) during the Nazi period. His grand-grand father was senator for construction with an important street in Hamburg still being named after him.

After his Abitur, Eiffe became Leutnant (reserve) of the Bundeswehr. He then started to study Business administration but broke off after a few semesters.
For a certain period he worked at the statal statistical office in Hamburg. His superiors attested him above-average intelligence, but his career came to a halt for other motives. He decorated his work-place with a portrait of Bismarck and erotic photographs and insulted each morning the cleaning personnel in French. Eventually he was fired in April 1968. Additionally, his wife left him together with their 18-month-old daughter.

1968 
In this time of personal crisis, he became famous In Hamburg for scrawling and scribbling all over the city, using mailboxes, billboards, traffic signs and subway stations and leaving whenever possible his business card: Peter-Ernst Eiffe, Wandsbeker Chaussee 305, 2000 Hamburg 22, including the phone number. When the Hamburger Hochbahn issued him a bill over 900 German marks for damages to their property, he answered by issuing them a bill of 900 marks for his artwork

Eiffe was also magically attracted by the student movement. He was seen ever more frequently at student assemblies, dressed in a suit with white shirt and tie, pushing for the microphone and explaining his theories about the subversive power of the joke. His friend Fritz Teufel nominated him as speaker for the May Day campaign of the APO in Berlin, where he announced under the cheers of thousands his desire to become the 
chancellor of students and demonstrators. The microphone, however, was turned off before he could elaborate his political platform.

On May 30, 1968, he drove his car with the slogan "Freie Eiffe-Republik" (Free  Eiffe Republic) into the main hall of the central station of Hamburg and started to decorate the tiles with triangles. He was quickly arrested, ushered away in handcuffs and taken under press coverage to the psychiatric hospital Hamburg-Ochsenzoll.

Shortly afterwards, a booklet with photos of his surrealistic graffiti was published by Uwe Wandrey and Peter Schütt. 3000 copied were sold, resulting in an honorary of 500 German marks for Eiffe.

Later life and legacy 

In November 1968 he was released from psychiatric care and found a job with a marketing agency in Düsseldorf. Nevertheless, in 1970 he had a case of clinical depression and was hospitalized in the psychiatric hospital Rickling in Schleswig-Holstein. On December 24, 1982, he managed to escaped from there. Eventually, his dead body was found in March 1983 in a moorland close to Rickling.

Nevertheless, the fame of Peter-Ernst Eiffe being the first German graffiti artist lived on. Christian Bau recalled his life in one-hour documentary film with the title Eiffe for president, alle Ampeln auf gelb, which was shown in 1996 in independent cinemas. The author Uwe Timm included a number of Eiffe's sayings in the text of his novel "Heißer Sommer".

See also 
 German student movement
 Kommune 1
 Ülo Kiple

References 

[Peter-Ernst] Eiffe: Eiffe for President, Frühling für Europa. Surrealismen zum Mai 68. Herausgabe und Information Uwe Wandrey. Politkritische Vorbemerkungen Peter Schütt. Hamburg: Quer-Verlag 1968
Hamburger Abendblatt, 1. Februar 1995 "Faszination des Wahnsinns" von Katharina Gessler

External links
Eiffe for President - Alle Ampeln auf Gelb: Official homepage of the documentary film

Note: This article contains translated text from the article Peter-Ernst Eiffe in the German-language Wikipedia.

1941 births
1982 deaths
German graffiti artists
Artists from Hamburg
People from Wandsbek
German adoptees
People with mood disorders